Fahad Al-Malki (Arabic: فهد المالكي; born 12 August 1992) is a football (soccer) player who currently plays as a winger .

External links
 

Saudi Arabian footballers
1992 births
Living people
Al-Nahda Club (Saudi Arabia) players
Al-Rawdhah Club players
Al-Zulfi FC players
Saudi Fourth Division players
Saudi First Division League players
Saudi Professional League players
Association football wingers